Earl Warren High School, is a public secondary school located in Downey, California (United States). Warren High School enrolls students in grades 9-12 and is a part of the Downey Unified School District.

History

Del Ward was the first principal of Warren High school, in 1955, and the current principal is Cari White.

Earl Warren Senior High School was originally instituted by the Downey Union High School District, which operated Downey Union High School where grades 7-12 were taught.  When that district built and began to operate separate junior high schools teaching grades 7-9, Downey's only high school was redesignated as Downey Senior High School and comprised grades 10-12.  Eventually, in 1956, Downey incorporated as the City of Downey and a few years later, the Downey Unified School District was formed from several elementary school districts in Downey and the Downey Union High School District, which continued the junior high school and senior high school model until the early 1970s.  At that time, the junior high schools in Downey became "middle schools" teaching grades 6-8 and the senior high schools became 4-year high schools comprising grades 9-12.

After its inception, class sizes grew gradually larger as a reflection of the Post-War Baby Boom.  The class of 1970, with 715 students graduating was the largest to date and, by then, extra classrooms were needed.  A new library was built, thus freeing up former library space for classrooms.  A new physics laboratory was constructed alongside existing classrooms, as was a new electronics laboratory.  The band room was remodeled, made windowless and soundproof and outfitted with an air conditioning system.  Two prefabricated, freestanding modular classrooms were added next to the library in the late 1960s to help accommodate the growing student body.  At the same time, a swimming pool was finally constructed for aquatic sports.

In the mid-1960s, the student body raised funds to save an old olive tree that was going to be destroyed to make room for new construction somewhere in Downey; the tree was transplanted to the Warren campus and became a symbol of school spirit.

Originally, the campus had a central hot-water heating system, which was impractical because of the many disjunct buildings, mostly with four classrooms apiece, served by covered, outdoor hallways.  The heating pipes had corroded in the ground and at various points resulted in pools of boiling mud where the pipes had ruptured.  Many classrooms were without heat.  In 1971, new forced air heating systems were retrofitted into the original classrooms which were served by the defunct hot-water heating systems.

In 2015, Warren High was awarded the California Gold Ribbon Award, based on their adoption and integration of the California State University's Expository Reading and Writing Course (ERWC) curriculum.

The boys' and girls' locker rooms, along with the aquatic center, went through a large scale renovation in 2017.  The grand ceremony was conducted on 23 September 2017.

The name

Earl Warren had been one of the most popular governors of California and was subsequently appointed as Chief Justice of the United States.  While serving as Chief Justice, the Supreme Court came up with a number of notable rulings, including Brown v. Board of Education, which abolished the long-standing "separate but equal" doctrine that allowed segregated schools in the United States.

Earl Warren had been invited to and appeared at, the dedication of the school in 1955.  Indeed the school colors of blue and gold were adopted because they were the official colors of the State of California.  The California state animal, the bear, was designated as the school mascot, and indeed all the sports teams at Earl Warren High were known as "the Bears."  The school newspaper was called "The Justice," and the girls' drill team was known as the "Honeybears."  (Earl Warren's daughter Nina Warren was nicknamed "Honeybear".) In fact, the class rings were designed to show, among other things, the scales of justice on one side and a gavel on the other, referring to Earl Warren's tenure as Chief Justice of the United States.

Demographics
Demographics for the 2018-2019 school year: 88.9% Latino or Hispanic, 2.7% African American, 2.9% Asian American, 4.8% European American, 0.3% American Indian, 0.2% Mixed, and  0.2% Pacific Islander.

Notable alumni
Rick Burleson, former Major League Baseball player
Eric Hipple Detroit Lions Quarterback 1981-1986
Kerry King, co-founder and guitarist for Slayer
Bobby LaFromboise, Major League Baseball player
 Lena Park, Korean-American R&B singer
 Paul Ruffner, former BYU and pro basketball player
 Jeff Tedford, head football coach at Fresno State, previously at University of California, Berkeley

References

External links
 
 Warren High School at Public Schools Report

High schools in Los Angeles County, California
Public high schools in California
Downey, California
1955 establishments in California
Educational institutions established in 1955